The Komazawa Hockey Field was a venue constructed in Tokyo, Japan for the field hockey competitions of 1964 Summer Olympics. Although there were three hockey fields, it marked the first time the field hockey was played in one single venue for the Summer Olympics since the 1920 Games.

Hockey Field 1
It also featured an electronic scoreboard. Construction occurred between December 1962 and June 1964.

Hockey Field 2
It also featured an electronic scoreboard. Construction occurred between December 1962 and June 1964.

Hockey Field 3
Construction occurred between December 1962 and September 1964.

References
1964 Summer Olympics official report. Volume 1. Part 1. pp. 126–7.

Venues of the 1964 Summer Olympics
Olympic field hockey venues
Defunct sports venues in Japan
Sports venues in Tokyo